Shaun O'Boyle is a science communicator, podcast producer and activist, best known for his work to promote science and to improve representation of LGBTQ+ scientists. He was the chair and one of the organisers of the Irish March for Science and also founded House of STEM which aims to connect LGBTQ+ scientists in Ireland.

Early life and education 
O'Boyle grew up in Donegal, Ireland, and completed a BSc in Physiology at NUI Galway. He also carried out his PhD in Developmental Biology from 2003-2008 there, where he investigated the first genes to be 'switched on' in developing zebrafish embryo.

Career 
O'Boyle completed a postdoctoral research position between 2009-2010 at University College Dublin, working with Kay Nolan on the evolution of genomic imprinting. He subsequently worked at Science Gallery Dublin from 2011-2016 in a variety of roles and also produced Futureproof for Newstalk radio station from 2010-2013. 

O'Boyle set up the audio producing partnership Bureau with artist Maurice Kelliher in 2013. Bureau have made radio documentaries and podcasts, on a diverse range of subjects, for: BBC Radio 4, Documentaries on Newstalk, Science Gallery Dublin/International, Irish Design 2015, LGBT History Month UK, Inspirefest, Festival of Curiosity, UCD/Science Foundation Ireland, and BBC World Service. Their documentaries and podcasts feature a diverse range of voices and issues and have been widely commended.

He established House of STEM in 2017 to connect and to address issues facing LGBTQ+ scientists in Ireland. In 2018 he helped set up LGBT STEM Day - in which a group of national and international organisations collaborated to create an initiative to raise awareness for LGBT+ people working in Science, Technology, Engineering and Maths. LGBT STEM Day falls on 5 July annually.

External sources 

 Shaun O'Boyle speaking at Inspirefest 2018.

References 

Year of birth missing (living people)
Living people
Science communicators
Irish scientists
Irish LGBT scientists